Strikeforce: Barnett vs. Cormier was a mixed martial arts event held by Strikeforce. It took place on May 19, 2012, at the HP Pavilion in San Jose, California.

Background
Nate Marquardt was expected to fight Tyron Woodley at this event for the vacant Strikeforce Welterweight Championship. It instead took place at Strikeforce: Rockhold vs. Kennedy, where Marquardt won the title by fourth-round knockout.

Results

Heavyweight Grand Prix Bracket

** = Replacement

References

External links
Bleacher Report
MMA Weekly Article
Yahoo subject-related videos
MMAFIGHTING.COM Article
SB Nation Article
MMA Mania Article
Bloody Elbow Article
Sports Yahoo Article
Youtube, subject related videos

Barnett vs. Cormier
2012 in mixed martial arts
Mixed martial arts in San Jose, California
2012 in sports in California
Events in San Jose, California